A malformative syndrome (or malformation syndrome)  is a recognizable pattern of congenital anomalies that are known or thought to be causally related (VIIth International Congress on Human Genetics).

Causes 

 exogenous causes
 exogenous toxic (teratogenetic agents)
 ionizing radiations
 fetal infections (maternofetal infections)
 genetic causes (or intrinsic causes) (genetic malformative diseases)
 chromosomal anomalies (chromosomal malformative diseases)
 numerical chromosomal anomalies (e.g. trisomy 13, trisomy 18, trisomy 21)
 structural chromosomal anomalies
 microdeletions (microdeletion syndromes)
 chromosomal rearrangements
 gene mutations (monogenic malformative diseases)
 Kabuki mask syndrome: MLL2
 Joubert syndrome, Meckel syndrome and related syndromes: TMEM216
 cleft lip with and without cleft palate: MAFB and ABCA4
 Schinzel–Giedion syndrome: SETBP1
 Fanconi anemia and related disorders: RAD51C
 Noonan syndrome: NRAS
 generalized lymph vessel dysplasia: CCBE1
 brachydactyly-anonychia: SOX9
 genetic metabolic diseases
 Smith–Lemli–Opitz syndrome

See also 
 Congenital abnormality
 Malformative syndrome
 ICD-10 Chapter Q: Congenital malformations, deformations and chromosomal abnormalities
 List of congenital disorders
 List of ICD-9 codes 740-759: Congenital anomalies
 March of Dimes

References

External links
 CDC’s National Center on Birth Defects and Developmental Disabilities
 Congenital Anomalies, official journal of the 

Congenital disorders
Animal developmental biology
Syndromes